State Road 211 (NM 211) is a  state highway in the US state of New Mexico. NM 211's southern terminus is at U.S. Route 180 (US 180) southeast of Cliff, and the northern terminus is at US 180 in Cliff.

Major intersections

See also

References

211
Transportation in Grant County, New Mexico